Antoine de Beaulieu (died 1663) was a French noble, dancer, and ballet master of the Swedish court from 1637 to 1663 and is considered to have introduced ballet in Sweden.

Antoine de Beaulieu was employed in Sweden after a recommendation to the Queen Dowager, Maria Eleonora of Brandenburg, by the French ambassador. Ballet was considered as a good exercise for boys of the nobility to move gracefully during riding and fencing. In 1638, Beaulieu performed a dramatic ballet with poems for Queen Christina by the order of Eleonora Catherine of Pfalz-Zweibrücken. The participants consisted of boys and men of the nobility, among them Magnus Gabriel de la Gardie and the future Charles X Gustav of Sweden. He made about 20 ballets until 1654. At the coronation of Christina in 1651, he performed in a coronation ballet.

See also 
 Anne Chabanceau de La Barre
 Antoine Bournonville
 Louis Gallodier

References 
 Sven Åke Heed: Ny svensk teaterhistoria. Teater före 1800 Gidlunds förlag (2007) 
 Leif Jonsson, Ann-Marie Nilsson, Greger Andersson: Musiken i Sverige. Från forntiden till stormaktstidens slut 1720 ("Music in Sweden. From Antiquity to the end of the Great power era 1720") 

1663 deaths
Swedish male ballet dancers
French male ballet dancers
17th-century French people
17th-century Swedish people
17th-century ballet dancers
French ballet masters
Year of birth unknown
People of the Swedish Empire
Court of Christina, Queen of Sweden